Cathedral Hill Historic District is a national historic district located at St. Joseph, Missouri. The district encompasses 309 contributing buildings, 1 contributing site, and contributing structures in a predominantly residential section of St. Joseph. It developed between about 1860 and 1950, and includes representative examples of Greek Revival, Italianate, Queen Anne, Colonial Revival, and American Craftsman style architecture. Located in the district is the separately listed Virginia Flats. Other notable buildings include the Nisen Stone House (c. 1885), Thomas Culligan House (c. 1872), A. D. Hudnutt House (1909), St. Joseph Cathedral (1877), James Wall House (c. 1880), Taylor Apartments (c. 1860), E. F. Weitheimer House (1888), Sarah and Ann Walsh Apartment House (1915), Henry Owen Stable (1898), George T. Hoagland Speculative House (1901), and James Hull House (1887).

It was listed on the National Register of Historic Places in 2000.

References

Historic districts on the National Register of Historic Places in Missouri
Italianate architecture in Missouri
Greek Revival architecture in Missouri
Queen Anne architecture in Missouri
Colonial Revival architecture in Missouri
Historic districts in St. Joseph, Missouri
National Register of Historic Places in Buchanan County, Missouri